Randy Ball is a former American college football player and coach. He served as the head coach at Western Illinois University from 1990 to 1998, and Missouri State University from 1999 through 2005, compiling a career college football coaching record of 98–83–1. Ball is currently a pro personnel scouting assistant for the Kansas City Chiefs of the National Football League (NFL), a position he has held since May 2013. Enshrined into the Western Illinois University Hall of Fame and the Missouri Sports Hall of Fame.

Coaching career
Ball was the head football coach at Western Illinois University from 1990 until 1998, compiling a record of 64–41–1.  This ranks him first at Western Illinois in total wins and sixth at Western Illinois in winning percentage.

After coaching at Western Illinois, Ball was head football coach for seven season at Missouri State University with a record of 34 wins and 42 losses.

Head coaching record

References

1951 births
Living people
American football offensive linemen
Drake Bulldogs football coaches
Illinois State Redbirds football coaches
Kansas City Chiefs scouts
Las Vegas Locomotives
Missouri State Bears football coaches
Missouri Western Griffons football coaches
Truman Bulldogs football coaches
Truman Bulldogs football players
Western Illinois Leathernecks football coaches
United Football League (2009–2012) executives
University of Missouri alumni
Sportspeople from Muskogee, Oklahoma